The 1970 Campeonato Ecuatoriano de Fútbol Serie A, the first division of Ecuadorian football (soccer), was played by 13 teams. The champion was Barcelona.

First stage

Liguilla de no descenso

Liguilla Final

External links
 Ecuador 1970 

1970
Ecu
Football